Diekmann may refer to :

Bruno Diekmann (1897–1982) was a German politician (SPD) from Kiel and Minister-President of Schleswig-Holstein (1949-1950).
Jake Diekman (born January 21, 1987), American professional baseball pitcher for Major League Baseball (MLB). 
Kai Diekmann (born June 27, 1964 in Ravensburg) is a German journalist.
Michael Diekmann (born December 23, 1954), German businessman and former CEO of Allianz
Miep Diekmann (1925–2017), Dutch writer of children's literature